Loxopholis southi, also known commonly as the northern spectacled lizard and the southern leposoma, is a species of lizard in the family Gymnophthalmidae. The species is native to southeastern Central America and northwestern South America. There are two recognized subspecies.

Etymology
The specific name, southi, is in honor of John Glover South (1873–1940), who was an American physician and diplomat.

Geographic range
L. southi is found in Costa Rica, Panama, and Colombia.

Reproduction
L. southi is oviparous.

Subspecies
Two subspecies are recognized as being valid, including the nominotypical subspecies:
Loxopholis southi orientalis 
Loxopholis southi southi 

Nota bene: A trinomial authority in parentheses indicates that the subspecies was originally described in a genus other than Loxopholis.

References

Further reading
Goicoechea N, Frost DR, De la Riva I, Pelligrino KCM, Sites J Jr, Rodrigues MT, Padial JM (2016). "Molecular systematics of teioid lizards (Teioidea/Gymnophthalmoidea: Squamata) based on the analysis of 48 loci under tree-alignment and similarity-alignment". Cladistics 32 (6): 624–671. (Loxopholis southi, new combination, p. 670).
Ruthven AG, Gaige HT (1924). "A new Leposoma from Panama". Occasional Papers of the Museum of Zoology, University of Michigan (147): 1–3. (Leposoma southi, new species).
Savage JM (2002). The Amphibians and Reptiles of Costa Rica: A Herpetofauna between Two Continents, between Two Seas. Chicago and London: University of Chicago Press. xx + 945 pp. .
Taylor EH (1955). "Additions to the Known Herpetological Fauna of Costa Rica with Comments on Other Species. No. II.". University of Kansas Science Bulletin 37: 499–575. (Leposoma southi orientalis, new subspecies, p. 546).

Loxopholis
Reptiles of Colombia
Reptiles of Costa Rica
Reptiles of Panama
Reptiles described in 1924
Taxa named by Alexander Grant Ruthven
Taxa named by Helen Beulah Thompson Gaige